Penicillium yarmokense is a species of fungus in the genus Penicillium which was isolated from soil near Es-Suveida in Syria.

References

Further reading 
 

yarmokense
Fungi described in 1968